Selenocephalini is a tribe of leafhoppers in the subfamily Deltocephalinae. Deltocephalinae contains 21 genera and around 200 species divided into four subtribes: Adamina, Dwightlina, Ianeirina and Selenocephalina.

Genera 
There are 21 genera divided into four subtribes within Selenocephalini:

Subtribe Adamina 

 Adama 

Subtribe Dwightlina 

 Dwightla 

Subtribe Ianeirina 

Subtribe Selenocephalina

References 

Deltocephalinae